This is the results breakdown of the local elections held in Navarre on 24 May 2015. The following tables show detailed results in the autonomous community's most populous municipalities, sorted alphabetically.

Opinion polls

Overall

City control
The following table lists party control in the most populous municipalities, including provincial capitals (shown in bold). Gains for a party are displayed with the cell's background shaded in that party's colour.

Municipalities

Barañain
Population: 20,458

Burlada
Population: 18,237

Egüés
Population: 19,014

Estella
Population: 13,695

Pamplona
Population: 196,166

Tafalla
Population: 10,966

Tudela
Population: 35,062

See also
2015 Navarrese regional election

References

Navarre
2015